Aviad Kleinberg (Hebrew: אביעד קליינברג, born November 25, 1957) is an Israeli historian whose academic work focuses on religious phenomena from Late Antiquity to the Reformation.
From 1990 to 2021 he was professor of medieval history at the department of History, Tel Aviv University. Between 2015 – 2019 he was head of the Zvi Yavetz School of Historical Studies.
Between 2001 – 2021 he was Director of Tel Aviv University Press. In 2021 he was elected president of the Ruppin Academic Center.

He is the member of Dan David Prize Board. The award is administered by Tel Aviv University. ￼

Early life and education 
Born and raised in Beer Sheva, Aviad Kleinberg completed his BA in history at Tel Aviv University (1982) and his PhD at University of Toronto in medieval studies.
His doctoral thesis, under the supervision of Brian Stock, studied the making of saintly reputation from the 12th -15th centuries.

His first book, "Prophets in Their Own Country" (published by Chicago University Press in 1992) is based on his thesis. It examines the interaction between would-be saints and their audiences. Kleinberg argues that sainthood as a social fact is found in the dynamic dialogue between a claimant and his or her interlocutors and is not a personal quality that can be understood outside what he calls "the saintly interaction".

In a later book, "Flesh Made Word" (Harvard University Press, 2008), Kleinberg moved from studying live interactions to the role of stories in creating a saintly repertoire. He argued that saints' stories are often used to "domesticate" living saints, by offering an impossibly successful model of sainthood. No saint can live up to the expectations created by hagiography, hence the saint is driven to collaborate with hagiographical creators who can strengthen his or her reputation by making him fit the inflated model. This creates a "debt" that can be used by the producers of stories in their interactions with saintly aspirants. The other phenomenon he notes in this book is the tendency stories to stretch the limits of "orthodox" sainthood.

In 2019 he wrote A Guide for the Non Believer and in 2020 A Short Guide to the Western Middle Ages(both in Hebrew).

Career 

From 1990 to 2021 he was professor of medieval history at the department of History, Tel Aviv University. Between 2015 – 2019 he was head of the Zvi Yavetz School of Historical Studies.

Between 2001 – 2021 he was Director of Tel Aviv University Press. In 2021 he was elected president of the Ruppin Academic Center.

Kleinberg is a public intellectual who often expresses himself on public issues. For many years he has written a weekly column in "Yedioth Ahronoth", a national newspaper in Israel, and also in haaretz. He also publishes a blog called "Shock hametziut" (Reality Shock).

Publications 
 The Sensual God: How the Senses Make the Almighty Senseless (NY, Columbia University Press, 2015).
 Le Dieu sensible. Bibliothèque des Idées. Gallimard, 2018.
 Flesh Made Word: Saints' Stories and the Western Imagination (Cambridge, Mas. Harvard U. P., Belnknap, 2008)
 Histoires de Saints: Leur rôle dans la formation de l'Occident. Bibliothèque des Histoires. Gallimard, Paris, 2005, 358 pp.
 Seven Deadly Sins: A Very Partial List (Cambridge Mas. Harvard U. P., Belknap, 2008).
 Prophets in Their Own Country: Living Saints and the Making of Sainthood in the Later Middle Ages. Chicago, The University of Chicago Press, 1992. (paperback, 1997)
 "A Hebrew Translation of St. Augustine's Confessions", Tel Aviv, 2001.
 Resurrection: Israel's First Fifty Years [Hebrew] Tel Aviv, 1998
 Christianity: A Study of Its History from Its Beginning to the Reformation. (Hebrew) Tel Aviv, 1995.

References

External links 
 Official Blog - A look on the Future's History
 Prof. Aviad Kleinberg official page on the Ruppin Academic Center site
 Between the Suns | Season 2, Episode 47 - Aviad Kleinberg, Kan 11

Israeli historians of religion

1957 births
Living people